Walt Walkinshaw (1917-2010) was an American attorney who "epitomized the Northwest character, old school. He was an outdoorsman, a lawyer with a strong conscience, and a passionate advocate of progressive causes," according to David Brewster in Crosscut.

Walkinshaw was born in 1917 in Seattle into a pioneering family – Mount Walkinshaw in the Olympic Mountains is named after his father Robert B. Walkinshaw, an author and lawyer.

After graduating cum laude from the University of Washington in 1939, he was chosen as one of 40 young Rockefeller Foundation interns in the federal government in Washington, D.C. He worked in various departments and ended up as a staff member in the executive office of President Franklin D. Roosevelt where he wrote reports on the various new agencies of the New Deal.

  Walkinshaw's career was interrupted by World War II. He served in the Navy for five years of continuous duty in war zones at sea. He started in the North Atlantic as a deck officer on a cargo ship dodging German submarines. His Asiatic-Pacific Theater ribbon contains three stars – one for Saipan, another for Iwo Jima, and the third for Okinawa. He also received a "special commendation for performance duty in operations" against Iwo Jima. When he was navigator of aircraft carrier USS Windham Bay, his ship was in the first bloody assault of that island. American journalist Ernie Pyle was at one time aboard the USS Windham Bay, and wrote about the importance of jeep carriers in naval battles. Walt retired in 1946 as a commander.

He then became a program analyst and foreign affairs specialist with the U.S. government's Interdepartmental Committee on Scientific and Cultural Cooperation. In this job, he worked with a little-known program of technical aid and exchange of scientific know-how with South America. He worked with a staff of three to get their idea of technical assistance to expand from South America to the rest of the world. In the Mundt bill (P.L. 402), the program was passed by Congress to go worldwide, but no funding was provided. It was not until a friend of Walkinshaw's, Benjamin Hardy, wrote the idea into the inaugural speech of President Harry S. Truman and the president announced this bold new program of aid for the underdeveloped world that it was funded and went worldwide. It was Truman's fourth point in his speech and thus named the Point Four Program.

Point Four was the first time in history that a powerful nation – in this case the industrial giant of the world – was committing itself to assist in the building up of other countries, not in order to gain dominion over them or to profit by their exploitation, but as a means of contributing to the establishment of a world order distinguished by personal freedom and social justice. Helping the world's sick, hungry, uneducated and discouraged to help themselves became a national policy.

In 1950, Walkinshaw was a representative of the United States Department of State on the Griffin Mission that went to Southeast Asia to establish Point Four. The idea of using younger people for overseas technical work was suggested in his final report for the Griffin Mission, and furthered by Lloyd Andrews who became head of Point Four. Andrews later had direct input when President John F. Kennedy founded the Peace Corps. Point Four also laid the foundation for what would later become USAID, the U.S. Agency for International Development.

Walkinshaw left Point Four in 1951 for several reasons. During the early 1950s, McCarthyism was at its height and Walkinshaw's boss was accused, and then cleared, as one of ten top subversive members of the State Department. He found that many of the colleagues he respected were being driven out of the State Department. Further, an idea he promoted in Point Four of appropriate technology and small improvements decided upon by the people involved was often being replaced by Marshall Plan types of big industrial projects. He also found that most budget requests had to be tied to the military.

Walkinshaw was deeply tied to the Northwest and wanted to get back to his roots in Seattle. He had earned his law degree from George Washington University while working full-time in the State Department, so he started his new law practice in Seattle and was a lone practitioner for 21 years before joining Riddell Williams law firm.

Not long after moving back to Seattle, he met his future wife Jean Strong at a Quaker meeting. Jean was a graduate of Stanford University and had just returned from Hiroshima, where she worked to build houses of good will. They soon married and had three children: Charlie, Rob and Meg.

Walkinshaw's wife Jean Walkinshaw also had deep ties to the Northwest. Her father was an early civil engineer who built roads including the North Cascades Highway to Marblemount and a portion of the road around the Olympic Peninsula. Mount Henderson in the Olympic Mountains is named after her grandfather. Jean became an award-winning documentary producer and produced for The History Channel; KING-TV, NBC affiliate in Seattle; and KCTS, the public television station in Seattle. She produced more than 50 documentaries. In 1992 she was inducted into the National Academy of Television Arts and Sciences Silver Circle for 25 years of significant contribution to the television industry and community.

As a lawyer, Walkinshaw drafted many state laws that established the direction of health care, including patient bill of rights, right to die, and licensure of health care professionals. He was also the attorney for the architects who designed SeaTac and the Washington State Convention Center.

Walkinshaw is listed in Men of Achievement (1973), and in several editions of Who's Who in the West.

Walkinshaw served as founding secretary for ACT Theater, and remained its secretary, attorney and advisor for 35 years. He helped start the Seattle chapter of Amigos de las Americas, an organization that sends teenagers as volunteers to Latin America. He served on many others boards including Northwest Kidney Centers, Municipal League, United Nations Association and City Club.

As an avid fly fisherman, he crusaded to preserve and maintain habitat and recreational areas. As attorney for the owners of the Nisqually Delta wetlands near Olympia, Washington, he steered his clients to sell their land to the government, which resulted in the Nisqually National Wildlife Refuge on the delta. He was an officer and director of the Washington Wildlife and Recreation Coalition. He was a member of the Marine Fisheries Advisory Committee, of the U.S. Department of Commerce from 1980 to 1983. And he was an officer and director of the Washington Fly Fishing Club.

His law partner Stimson Bullitt, remembering their long-time friendship, wrote of Walkinshaw, "You are the only person I have known for whom I thought ethical decisions were not hard – that on coming to a moral fork in the road, you would take the right one without breaking stride."

Walkinshaw died in Seattle on April 16, 2010, at age 93. In a tribute to Walt, national correspondent Joel Connelly of the Seattle P-I wrote that Walt "became one of the self-effacing, credit sharing 'Greatest Generation' activists who shaped the postwar city and region."

References

External links 
 David Brewster. “Walt Walkinshaw, salt of the Northwest earth.” Crosscut 
 Mt. Walkinshaw in the Olympic Mountains
 USS Windham Bay, ship historian's report
 Joel Connelly. “Walt Walkinshaw: An appreciation.” Seattle P-I
 Walt Walkinshaw, The Seattle Times obituary

Point Four Program
 Harry S. Truman Presidential Library & Museum: Walter and Jean Walkinshaw Papers

Lawyers from Seattle
United States Navy personnel of World War II
American environmentalists
1917 births
2010 deaths
20th-century American lawyers